Dragutin Brahm (26 August 1909, Zagreb – 27 June 1938, Starigrad) was a Yugoslav mountain climber. He died while attempting the first ascent of the Anica kuk wall in the Paklenica climbing area, making him the first casualty in the history of Croatian rock climbing.

Life in brief 

House painter and decorator by profession, Brahm was noted in his early age as table tennis player and skier. He obtained various positions with Zagreb-based Cepin Alpine Club. Apart from climbing in the western parts of the Dinaric Alps, in the early 1930s Brahm bagged successfully the summits of Jalovec, (Couloir route), Triglav over the north face, and Grossglockner.

Death and aftermath 

On June 26, 1938, shortly after midnight, Brahm and three others took a train from Zagreb to Gračac. 
From there, they hired a car to Obrovac where they boarded a boat for Starigrad. At 3 a.m. the next day, they hiked into Paklenica gorge to the foot of the 350 m high Anica kuk face. After a six-hour climb and about 3/4 of the route completed, Brahm fell , his head bouncing off the rock and his body landed in squat position on the ledge where his belaying partner was.

Once his partner unbelayed Brahm's corpse, already dead Brahm leaned backwards and fell again, this time the entire length of the Anica kuk face.

In the two years following the accident, no other climbing attempt in Paklenica occurred. On the 2nd anniversary of Brahm's death (June 27, 1940), Marijan Dragman/Drago Brezovečki party completed the unfinished job. The route was named in honor of Brahm. These days, the Brahm route is considered the classic, and it is the oldest climbing route at the entire Paklenica climbing site.

References 
 Hrvatski planinar, 1938, vol. 7, pages 51–52
 Poljak željko, Zlatna Knjiga Hrvatskog Planinarstva, LIBERA EDITIO d.o.o., 2004:

External links 
Brahm' route at Summitpost.com
Brahmov smjer 
"Vreme", 6. jul 1938 

1909 births
1938 deaths
Mountaineering deaths
Sport deaths in Yugoslavia
Yugoslav mountain climbers